The Asia/Oceania Zone was one of the three zones of the regional Davis Cup competition in 2001.

In the Asia/Oceania Zone there were four different tiers, called groups, in which teams competed against each other to advance to the upper tier. The top two teams in Group IV advanced to the Asia/Oceania Zone Group III in 2002. All other teams remained in Group IV.

Participating nations

Draw
 Venue: Abu Dhabi Airport Golf and Tennis Club, Abu Dhabi, United Arab Emirates
 Date: 25–29 April

Group A

Group B

1st to 4th place play-offs

5th to 8th place play-offs

Final standings

  and  promoted to Group III in 2002.

Round robin

Group A

Bangladesh vs. Oman

Fiji vs. Iraq

Bangladesh vs. Fiji

Oman vs. Iraq

Bangladesh vs. Iraq

Oman vs. Fiji

Group B

Pacific Oceania vs. Jordan

United Arab Emirates vs. Brunei

Pacific Oceania vs. United Arab Emirates

Jordan vs. Brunei

Pacific Oceania vs. Brunei

Jordan vs. United Arab Emirates

1st to 4th place play-offs

Semifinals

Pacific Oceania vs. Iraq

United Arab Emirates vs. Oman

Final

United Arab Emirates vs. Pacific Oceania

3rd to 4th play-off

Iraq vs. Oman

5th to 8th place play-offs

5th to 8th play-offs

Brunei vs. Bangladesh

Jordan vs. Fiji

5th to 6th play-off

Fiji vs. Bangladesh

7th to 8th play-off

Brunei vs. Jordan

References

External links
Davis Cup official website

Davis Cup Asia/Oceania Zone
Asia Oceania Zone Group IV